Eter Tataraidze (born 15 March 1956) is a Georgian poet, folklorist and philologist.

Biography 
Eter Tataraidze was born in Zemo Alvani, Akhmeta municipality, Georgia.

She graduated from Tbilisi State University in 1984 as a philologist. 1985–2006 she worked in the Department of Folklore by the Tbilisi State University.

Eter Tataraidze is the author of thirteen books, including six poetic collections. 

She writes her poems one of Georgian dialects Tushetian (Tušuri, თუშური); because of this phenomenon Eter Tataraidze's poetry works have a special colour, as in the case of Frédéric Mistral, who wrote in a Provençal. 

"Loyal to her creative principle, Eter Tataraidze writes in the dialect which seems to be the only means of expressing her thoughts, emotions and attitudes. Still, her lyrical language is different from her native Tushuri dialect which abounds in heroic poetry. The poems of the present collection are written in the everyday language which has no analogues in the otherwise rich Tushuri dialect. In this respect it is an untilled soil, a virgin land."

In 2007 she was awarded with a State Order of Honor. 

In addition, Tataraidze is a winner of several prizes. Some of his works have been translated into English and Italian.

Books
 Two, Three, Four (verses), Meridiani publishing, 2018
 It’s Our End!, Tbilisi, Intelecti publishing, 2016
 As the bird chirrups (verses), Tbilisi, Saunje publishing, 2012
 My father took his glory from the Lord God (non-fiction), Tbilisi, 'Erovnuli Mtserloba' publishing, 2008 
 100 Poems, Tbilisi, Intelecti publishing, 2012
 Agato (non-fiction), Tbilisi, Universali publishing, 2009
 Life Has Passed At Me (verses), Tbilisi, Lomisi publishing, 1988
 Horse-shoe of Moon (verses), Tbilisi, Merani publishing, 1988
 Hope Chamomile (verses), Tbilisi, Nakaduli publishing, 1979

Awards and honors
 Ilia Chavchavadze prize of Georgian-European Institute of Paris for the book - „Graced from God‟ (1990); 
 Literary Price Saba for the book „Remember Me With Mercy‟, 2008
 The Golden Wing prize, 2011 
 Ilia Chavchavadze prize „Saguramo‟ – for poetry, 2012 
 The folklore national prize in 2009. 
 For the contribution to the popularisation and advancement of Georgian folklore, she was awarded with Zurab Tsereteli Prize
(2013).

References

External links 
 Georgian Female Poets, stage 47 - Eter Tataraidze
 au:Tʻatʻaraiże, Etʻer.
 ETER TATARAIDZE

1956 births
Writers from Tbilisi
Tbilisi State University alumni
Living people
Women poets from Georgia (country)
Folklorists from Georgia (country)
Philologists from Georgia (country)
20th-century writers from Georgia (country)
21st-century writers from Georgia (country)
20th-century women writers from Georgia (country)
21st-century women writers from Georgia (country)